Winding Gulf is an unincorporated community in Raleigh County, West Virginia, United States. Winding Gulf is located on Winding Gulf, south of Sophia.

History

Justis Collins (Coal Baron) built coal camps in Winding Gulf in 1910. There were over 50 miners who died in the mines at Winding Gulf over the years. The mines were served by the Virginian Railroad.  There were several collieries in Winding Gulf such as, No. 1 camp, No. 2 camp, Lynwynn camp, Epperly Hill, and Farley Hill. Winding Gulf was the third largest town in Raleigh County in the 1920s. Mining in Winding Gulf lasted into the late 1980s.

References

Unincorporated communities in Raleigh County, West Virginia
Unincorporated communities in West Virginia
Coal towns in West Virginia